Audacious France (LFA) is a French political party positioned centre-right on the political spectrum.

The movement was founded by Christian Estrosi as a movement of local elected officials in October 2017 with several right-wing personalities such as Jean-Luc Moudenc, mayor of Toulouse; Gilles Avérous, mayor of Châteauroux; Alain Chrétien, mayor of Vesoul; and Luc Lemonnier, mayor of Le Havre. LFA became a party in 2020.

History

Launch 
On October 14, 2017, Christian Estrosi, mayor of Nice, launched a movement of local elected officials which he called “France audacieuse”. This name was already that of a civil society think tank, active since 2016, which carries out in-depth studies on sustainable development and the social economy. The launch of Christian Estrosi's movement was therefore marred by accusations of plagiarism, heavily relayed on Twitter and in the media. The object of the association was to "bring a renewal in French political life by organizing the voice of the territories and bringing the voice of citizens to allow the development of a democratic life that is more participatory and more representative".

Transformation into a political party 
On September 22, 2020, Christian Estrosi announced at a general assembly the transformation of his movement into a political party to "make the voice of the territories heard" and "weigh in the political debate".

Organization 
Audacious France has three deputies, including two members of the Les Républicains group and one member of the La République en Marche group:

 Yves Hemedinger, elected in the first constituency of Haut-Rhin
 Marine Brenier, elected in the fifth constituency of the Alpes-Maritimes
 Romain Grau, elected in the first constituency of the Pyrénées-Orientales

Audacious France also has two senators, all members of the Les Républicains group:

 Jean Bacci, Mayor of Moissac-Bellevue, Senator from Var
 Françoise Dumont, Senator for Var

References 

Centre-right parties in Europe
Political parties in France
2020 establishments in France
Gaullists
Christian democratic parties in Europe